Cenothyla is a genus of beetles in the family Cicindelidae, containing the following species:

 Cenothyla cognata (Chaudoir, 1843)
 Cenothyla consobrina (Lucas, 1857)

References

Cicindelidae